Kim LaSata (born April 20, 1963) is an American politician who has served in the Michigan Senate from the 21st district since 2019.

Education 
LaSata earned a Bachelor of Science degree in education from Western Michigan University. LaSata earned a master's degree in literacy studies from Western Michigan University.

Career 
On November 8, 2016, LaSata won the election and became a Republican member of the Michigan House of Representatives for District 79. LaSata defeated Marletta Seats and Carl G. Oehling with 58.78% of the votes. LaSata served in the Michigan House of Representatives until 2018.

On November 6, 2018, LaSata won the election and became a state senator of Michigan Senate for District 21. LaSata defeated Ian Haight with 58.13% of the votes.

Personal life 
LaSata's husband is Charlie. They have four children. LaSata and her family live in Bainbridge Township, Michigan.

See also 
 2016 Michigan House of Representatives election

References

External links 
 Kim LaSata at ballotpedia.org
 Kim LaSata at statesenatorkimlasata.com

1963 births
Living people
Republican Party members of the Michigan House of Representatives
Republican Party Michigan state senators
People from St. Joseph, Michigan
Women state legislators in Michigan
20th-century American women
21st-century American women politicians
21st-century American politicians
20th-century American people